ACSM may refer to:

Academy Sergeant Major (AcSM), the senior warrant officer at the Royal Military Academy Sandhurst
Accumulated Campaign Service Medal
Adobe Content Server Manager, a file format used with Adobe Digital Editions to provide digital rights management for e-books
American College of Sports Medicine
American Congress on Surveying and Mapping
Associateship of the Camborne School of Mines, a British mining qualification